John Maurice Shaftesley OBE (1901–1981) was an English journalist and writer, and editor of The Jewish Chronicle from 1946 to 1958.

He was appointed an Officer of the Order of the British Empire (OBE) in 1956.

He was the uncle of  American volcanologist David Richardson.

References

External links
Catalogue of Shaftesley's papers at University of Southampton

1901 births
1981 deaths
English newspaper editors
English male journalists
English Jews
Officers of the Order of the British Empire
People educated at Salford Grammar School
English male non-fiction writers